Century Estates is a locality in northern Alberta, Canada within Athabasca County. It is adjacent to the designated place of McNabb's, which is in the Hamlet of Colinton, Alberta.

See also 
List of communities in Alberta

References 

Localities in Athabasca County